The discography of American R&B singer-songwriter and rapper Lil' Mo consists of five studio albums, two mixtapes and fourteen singles (sixteen as featured performer).

Based on a True Story is Mo's debut album, released on June 26, 2001. It peaked at number 14 on the US Billboard 200 albums chart and attained a gold certification from the RIAA. It featured a total of four charting singles: "5 Minutes", "Ta Da", "Superwoman Pt. II", and "Gangsta (Love 4 the Streets)".

In 2002, Lil' Mo received her first ASCAP Rhythm & Soul Award, BMI Urban Music Award and BMI Pop Music Award for her contribution to Ja Rule's hit single "Put It on Me".

On April 29, 2003, Mo released her second album, Meet the Girl Next Door, which was led by the hit single, "4Ever". In 2003, Lil' Mo received two ASCAP Rhythm & Soul Music Awards for "Award-Winning R&B/Hip-Hop Songs" and "Award-Winning Rap Songs" for her contribution to Fabolous' single, "Can't Let You Go". The following year, Mo received the ASCAP Pop Music Award for her work on "Can't Let You Go". In 2007 and 2011, Lil' Mo released her follow-up studio efforts, Pain & Paper and P.S. I Love Me respectively.

Albums

Studio albums

Mixtapes

Singles

As lead artist

As featured artist

Promotional singles

Guest appearances

References

External links
 

Discographies of American artists
Rhythm and blues discographies